Andrew Golden may refer to:

Andrew Golden (1986–2019), one of the juvenile perpetrators of the Westside School shooting
Andrew K. Golden (born 1959), American investment company president